Rockeye is the fifth album by the British band, The Outfield. It was the band's second album to be released under the MCA label. "Going Back" became a hit single in South Africa on Adult Contemporary radio and the opening track, "Winning It All," was used as the ending song for NBC's broadcasts of the NBA Finals from 1992 to 1996, and during the end credits of the 1992 film The Mighty Ducks.

Track listing
All songs written by John Spinks, except where noted.

Personnel

The Outfield
Tony T Lewis - Vocals, Bass
John Frederick Spinks - Electric & Acoustic Guitars, Keyboards; Lead Vocals on "Under a Stone", "Jane" and "On the Line", Backing Vocals

Additional Personnel
Simon Dawson - Drums, Percussion
David Fitzgerald - Saxophone
Alvin Lee - Lead Guitar
Stephen Marcussen, Ian Thomas - Programming
Reg Webb - Piano

Production
Adapted from allmusic.
Arranged By The Outfield
Produced By John Spinks
Engineered By Graham Meek & Nigel "Chopper" Palmer
Mixed By Nigel Green
Mastered By Stephen Marcussen

Notes

External links 
 

The Outfield albums
1992 albums